The Helio Twin Courier is a twin-engined version of the Helio Courier, with very few examples being produced.

Design and development
Known by Helio as the model H-500 this STOL aircraft mounted twin Lycoming engines on top of the high-set wing, close to the fuselage. With the engines mounted in this manner, lateral and over-the-nose visibility were much improved while the propellers were kept clear of cabin doors and away from possible debris damage during rough field operations. This was a tail-wheel design, so the vertical component of propeller thrust assisted STOL take-off performance from rough fields.
In 1967 or 68, work was started on a redesign of the Twin Courier in a tricycle-gear configuration for the commercial market, since many firms which desired STOL capability had regulations which required multi-engine aircraft. The company ran out of money and the project was terminated.

The aircraft structure of the Helio Stallion, a single-engine turboprop version of the more successful Helio Courier, was based on the design of the Twin Courier.

The Twin Courier could seat six and first flew in April 1960, being awarded FAA certification on June 11, 1963. (The Twin Courier met FAA requirements marginally and was certificated to meet immediate needs for service in Vietnam, on the understanding that the design would not be marketed commercially. Thus, the redesign mentioned above.)  Only seven examples were built, these receiving the United States Armed Forces designation U-5A. One was reported to have been evaluated by US Army Special Forces. Furthermore, fully automatic full-span, leading-edge slats were fitted along with high-lift flaps.

Operators 

 Aviation Research Centre
 Indian Intelligence Bureau

 Air America
 CIA
 United States Air Force

Specifications (U-5A Twin Courier)

References

Notes

Bibliography
Taylor, John W. R. (editor). Jane's All The World's Aircraft 1965-66. London:Sampson Low, Marston, 1965.
 "Helio Twin-Courier" Probert Encyclopaedia
 "UNUSUAL AIRPLANES 2" All Metal Plane
 http://www.flightglobal.com/pdfarchive/view/1965/1965%20-%200543.html?search=Helio%20Twin%20Courier

1960s United States civil utility aircraft
Twin Courier
High-wing aircraft
Aircraft first flown in 1960
STOL aircraft
Twin piston-engined tractor aircraft